12th FFCC Awards
December 12, 2007

Best Film: 
 No Country for Old Men 

The 12th Florida Film Critics Circle Awards, given by the Florida Film Critics Circle on December 12, 2007, honored the best in film for 2007.

Winners
Best Actor:
Daniel Day-Lewis - There Will Be Blood
Best Actress:
Elliot Page - Juno
Best Animated Film:
Ratatouille
Best Cinematography:
The Assassination of Jesse James by the Coward Robert Ford and No Country for Old Men - Roger Deakins
Best Director:
Ethan and Joel Coen - No Country for Old Men
Best Documentary Film:
No End in Sight
Best Film:
No Country for Old Men
Best Foreign Language Film:
The Diving Bell and the Butterfly (Le scaphandre et le papillon) • France/USA
Best Original Songs:
Glen Hansard and Markéta Irglová - Once
Best Screenplay:
Juno - Diablo Cody
Best Supporting Actor:
Javier Bardem - No Country for Old Men
Best Supporting Actress:
Amy Ryan - Gone Baby Gone
Pauline Kael Breakout Award:
Elliot Page - Juno

Notes

References

2
2007 film awards